Sam Yates (born August 1983) is a British director.

Yates grew up in Stockport. He was selected as one of Screen International'''s Stars of Tomorrow, named a rising star in The Observer, and featured in GQ Magazine's "Men of the next 25 years". Yates has been described as "a major talent" in The Guardian, and "a director of unusual flair" in The Observer. He studied English at Homerton College, Cambridge.

His productions have been nominated for two Olivier Awards: Best Actress in a Supporting Role in a Musical for Murder Ballad (2017), and Outstanding Achievement in an Affiliate Theatre for The Phlebotomist by Ella Road (2019).

Yates has directed two music videos for Ivor Novello Award-nominated band Bear's Den, "Auld Wives" and "Emeralds".

Yates is known for his "eclectic body of work" and his "superb sense for casting", having directed leading talent Andrew Scott, Ruth Wilson, Hayley Atwell, Gemma Arterton, Christian Slater, Matthew Broderick, Ciaran Hinds, Jane Horrocks, Elizabeth McGovern and Jonah Hauer-King.

He is in a relationship with Irish actress Charlie Murphy.

 Selected work 

 Stage 
 The Two Character Play by Tennessee Williams (2021, Hampstead Theatre), with Kate O'Flynn and Zubin Varla. 
 A Separate Peace by Tom Stoppard, (2020, Platform Presents and The Remote Read), with Jenna Coleman, David Morrissey, Denise Gough, Ed Stoppard and Maggie Service.
 Incantata by Paul Muldoon, created by Stanley Townsend and Sam Yates, (2020, Irish Rep, Off-Broadway, New York), (2019, The Gate Theatre, Dublin), (2018, Town Hall Theatre, Galway International Festival), featuring Stanley Townsend.
 The Starry Messenger by Kenneth Lonergan with Matthew Broderick and Elizabeth McGovern (2019, Wyndham's Theatre, West End).
 The Phlebotomist by Ella Road, featuring Jade Anouka (2019, Hampstead Theatre). Nominated for 2019 Olivier Award.  
 Glengarry Glen Ross by David Mamet with Mark Benton and Nigel Harman (2019, UK No.1 Tour)
 The Phlebotomist by Ella Road, featuring Jade Anouka (2018, Hampstead Theatre Downstairs)
 Glengarry Glen Ross by David Mamet (2017–18, Playhouse Theatre, West End) with Christian Slater, Stanley Townsend, Robert Glenister, Kris Marshall, Don Warrington, Daniel Ryan and Oliver Ryan
 Desire Under the Elms by Eugene O'Neill (2017, Crucible Theatre, Sheffield) with Matthew Kelly and Aoife Duffin
  Murder Ballad by Julia Jordan and Juliana Nash with Ramin Karimloo, Kerry Ellis, Victoria Hamilton-Barritt and Norman Bowman (2016, Arts Theatre, West End). Nominated for 2017 Olivier Award for Best Supporting Actress in a Musical
 Cymbeline by William Shakespeare with Joseph Marcell and Pauline McLynn (2015-2016, Sam Wanamaker Playhouse, Shakespeare's Globe). Ian Charleson Award nomination
 East is East by Ayub Khan Din with Pauline McLynn (2015, ATG, Jamie Lloyd Productions, UK Tour)
 Outside Mullingar by John Patrick Shanley with Deirdre O'Kane and Owen McDonnell (2015, Ustinov Theatre, Bath)
 East is East by Ayub Khan Din with Jane Horrocks and Ayub Khan-Din (2014–15, Trafalgar Studios, ATG and Jamie Lloyd Productions, West End)
 Billy Liar by Keith Waterhouse and Willis Hall with Harry McEntire (2014, Royal Exchange Theatre, Manchester). Winner Manchester Theatre Awards for Best Actor and Best Newcomer
 The El Train – Three One Act Plays by Eugene O'Neill with Ruth Wilson and Nicola Hughes (2013, Hoxton Hall)
 Cornelius by J.B. Priestley with Alan Cox (2012-13 Finborough Theatre and 59E59 New York)
 Mixed Marriage by St John Ervine with Daragh O'Malley and Nora-Jane Noone (2011, Finborough Theatre)
 Purgatory by W.B. Yeats (2006, C Venues, Edinburgh Festival)
 Macbeth by William Shakespeare (2005, C Venues, Edinburgh Festival)

 Film & Television 
 Agatha and the Curse of Ishtar by Tom Dalton (TV movie, Channel 5 and Endemol Shine Group) with Lyndsey Marshal, Jonah Hauer-King, Jack Deam, Bronagh Waugh, Waj Ali, Crystal Clarke, Rory Fleck Byrne, Katherine Kingsley and Stanley Townsend. 
 The Hope Rooms by David Watson (short film) with Ciarán Hinds, Andrew Scott and Agnieszka Grochowska
 All's Well That Ends Well by William Shakespeare (short film) with Ruth Wilson and Lindsay Duncan (2016, Shakespeare's Globe)
 Love's Labour's Lost by William Shakespeare (short film) with Gemma Arterton and David Dawson (2016, Shakespeare's Globe)
 Cymbeline by William Shakespeare (short film) with Hayley Atwell and Kevin Harvey (2016, Shakespeare's Globe)
 Auld Wives by Bear's Den (music video) with Joseph Marcell, Lisa Dwyer-Hogg and Patrick McAuley (Communion Music)
 Emeralds by Bear's Den (music video) with Aoife Duffin and Eleanor Matsuura (Communion Music)
 Magpie''

References

External links
 

British theatre directors
People from Stockport
Alumni of Homerton College, Cambridge
Living people
1983 births